The 1958–59 season was Port Vale's 47th season of football in the English Football League, and their first season in the newly created Fourth Division following their relegation from the Third Division South. They scored a club-record 110 goals in 46 league matches to storm to the Fourth Division title. Forwards Stan Steele, Jack Wilkinson,  Graham Barnett, Harry Poole, and John Cunliffe all reached double-figures in front of goal.

Overview

Fourth Division
The pre-season saw the arrival of the 'speedy and direct' winger Brian Jackson (signed from Liverpool for £2,000), experienced left-back Roy Pritchard (Notts County), and Peter Hall (Stoke City). There was also a change of chairman, as Jake Bloom took charge. He initiated a change of kit, as Vale played in black and amber striped jerseys with black shorts.

The season opened with a 4–1 home defeat by Northampton Town, Andy Woan scoring the first goal of the new division. Roy Sproson was then dropped from the first eleven, and Vale failed to find a win in Burslem until 29 September. Their away form proved to be outstanding though, as the team recorded seven wins in their first nine away fixtures. On 24 September, Vale Park saw its first match under the new £17,000 floodlights, as the club beat West Bromwich Albion (who included Ronnie Allen in their line-up) 5–3. With a 4–1 win over Southport five days later, The Sentinel'''s 'T.G.F.' remarked that "the spell is broken". Vale remained unbeaten at home for the rest of the season. Strong in attack, the club took until 11 October before failing to score, in a goalless draw with Oldham Athletic witnessed by Shirley Bassey (as a guest of Norman Low). A fortnight later Vale failed to beat Carlisle United, as referee J.G.Williams blew the full-time whistle just as a Jack Wilkinson header was floating into the opposition's net. On 8 November, Vale beat Exeter City 5–3 in a top-of-the-table clash. Two consecutive away defeats followed soon after, as Vale fell down to third. The 4–2 loss in an 'appalling mud bath' at The Den saw the débuts of keeper Ken Hancock and striker Graham Barnett.

A twelve match unbeaten run followed, taking Vale four points clear at the top. This included a triumphant 8–0 Boxing day win over Gateshead (a Vale Park record and their biggest win since 24 September 1932), followed by a 4–0 win at Redheugh Park on New Year's Day. Roy Sproson was then brought back into the defensive line, whilst up front Stan Steele 'did the work of two men', Harry Poole brought 'flexibility and fluidity', and Barnett scored from half-chances. Just as Vale seemed to be running away with the title, defeat came on 16 March at Highfield Road to Coventry City. The following month the "Valiants" beat the "sky blues" 3–0, taking them six points ahead of the chasing pack. Promotion was secured on 18 April with a 1–1 draw at home to Darlington, and the title was secured with a final day victory over Millwall.

They finished as champions with 64 points, four points clear of second, and seven clear of fifth spot. They had secured twelve victories on the road, as despite nobody recording a hat-trick all season, a club-record 110 goals were scored – with five players reaching double-figures. The defence was also strong, only Coventry and York City conceded fewer. Praise came in for manager Norman Low, who in turned praised Barnett as 'the supreme goal poacher', Hancock as 'the find of the season', whilst Steele was 'the model of consistency'.

Finances
On the financial side, gate receipts rose by 20% to £39,934, whilst there was a transfer credit of £6,075. Wages had risen to £26,535, however the club's Sportsmen's Association made a donation of £9,069 to give the club a profit of £8,595. Pleased with his players, Low only released Alan Martin (Northwich Victoria) and reserve Ken Higgs (who went on to enjoy a successful cricket career). The stadium received an upgrade, as the Bycars End was terraced, increasing capacity by 6,500 to 50,000, and the car park was extended and additional drains were installed.

Cup competitions
In the FA Cup, Vale exited in the First Round with a 1–0 defeat by Torquay United at Plainmoor.

ResultsPort Vale's score comes first''

Football League Fourth Division

League table

Results by matchday

Matches

FA Cup

Player statistics

Appearances

Top scorers

Transfers

Transfers in

Transfers out

References
Specific

General

Port Vale F.C. seasons
Port Vale